Pryshyb is a village in Alchevsk Raion (district) in Luhansk Oblast of eastern Ukraine, at about 35 km WNW from the centre of Luhansk city, on the right bank of the Siverskyi Donets river.

The settlement was taken under control of pro-Russian forces during the War in Donbas, that started in 2014.

Climate

Demographics
In 2001 the settlement had 443 inhabitants. Native language as of the Ukrainian Census of 2001:
Ukrainian — 80.59%
Russian — 19.41%

References

Villages in Alchevsk Raion